

Worldwide

New species

See also Bird species new to science described in the 2000s

 Foothill elaenia Myiopagis olallai from Ecuador and Peru is described as new to science in The Wilson Bulletin
 Caatinga antwren Herpsilochmus sellowi from Brazil is described as new to science in the American journal The Auk
 Taiwan bush-warbler Bradypterus alishanensis is described as new to science in the American journal The Auk
 Scarlet-banded barbet Capito wallacei is described as new to science.

Rediscoveries
 Four pairs of Chinese crested terns are found breeding on the Matsu Islands, the first sighting anywhere in the world since 1991.

Taxonomic developments
To be completed

Ornithologists

Deaths
 12 April - Ronald Lockley (born 1903)

Europe

Britain

Breeding birds
To be completed

Migrant and wintering birds
 Several hundred European honey buzzards pass through during the autumn.

Rare birds
 Two zitting cisticolas in Dorset are the third and fourth for Britain.
 A Swinhoe's storm petrel near Aberdeen in July is the first for Scotland and eighth for Britain.
 Britain's first Siberian blue robin is seen in Suffolk during October.
 Britain's first long-tailed shrike is found in the Outer Hebrides in November.

Other events
 The British Birdwatching Fair has albatrosses as its theme for the year.

Ireland
 A blue-winged warbler at Cape Clear in October is the first record for Europe.

Scandinavia
To be completed

North America
To be completed

Asia
To be completed

References

Birding and ornithology
Bird
Birding and ornithology by year